Amos Supuni (Malawi, 1970 - Mozambique, December 2008) was a sculptor from Zimbabwe.

Biography
Supuni's parents moved to Zimbabwe when he was two months old.

In 1989 Supuni joined a Catholic youth group in Tafara, just outside Harare, where he received lessons in sculpture from Tapfuma Gutsa. The group later moved to Silvera House.

In 1991, Supuni spent six months in Tanzania within a cultural exchange program. There he learnt various other techniques such as print making, lino cut and etching. After his return to Zimbabwe he continued work at Silvera House until 1996. Later he became artist-in-residence in Chapungu Sculpture Park.

In the fall of 1999, Amos was artist in residence at Florida Southern College where he created sculptures and taught a stone sculpture class.

In 2002 Supuni went to Utah to teach stone carving.

Supuni died before his forties and left a widow. He was killed in search of food for his family in neighboring Mozambique.

Work
In his work Supuni refers to contemporary social issues concerning street kids, homelessness and poverty. On the other side, his images show joy, such as the pride of a father holding his newborn child. In addition he uses cultural icons in his work.

Supuni made his sculptures mostly in the hard springstone, but also used mixed media, such as a fusion of wood, stone and metal in his work Hwata (secretary bird), which was displayed on Atlanta airport.

Used sources
University of Cape Town, Amos Supuni
Utonga Gallery
University of Utah
Atlanta Airport Art Program Zimbabwe
Alta Community Enrichment

Zimbabwean sculptors
Malawian artists
Malawian sculptors
1970 births
2008 deaths
20th-century sculptors